Ivyland is a defunct station on the Reading Company's New Hope Branch. The station is currently on the line used by the New Hope and Ivyland Railroad.  The station closed in 1952 along with the other stations north of Warminster.  The station was built in 1890 and is now demolished.

References

Railway stations in the United States opened in 1891
Railway stations closed in 1952
Former Reading Company stations
Former railway stations in Bucks County, Pennsylvania